Peaceful Oscar is a 1927 American comedy film directed by Fatty Arbuckle.

Cast
 Lloyd Hamilton 
 Toy Gallagher
 Henry Murdoch
 Blanche Payson
 Billy Hampton

See also
 Fatty Arbuckle filmography

External links

1927 films
Films directed by Roscoe Arbuckle
1927 comedy films
1927 short films
American silent short films
American black-and-white films
Silent American comedy films
American comedy short films
1920s American films